Tetepare is an extinct language of Tetepare Island. According to local oral history, the indigenous people of the now-uninhabited island of Tetepare spoke their own language, different from the other languages of the region.

Classification
Published materials are insufficient to establish whether this language was an Austronesian language like most of the surrounding languages (Roviana, Marovo and the rest of the New Georgia subgroup), or a non-Austronesian language like neighboring Touo. Language maps sometimes show the Touo language extending to Tetepare Island, but this seems to be an accident.

See also
Northwest Solomonic languages
Kazukuru language

References

Read, John; Moseby, Vertebrates of Tetepare Island, Solomon Islands 1. Katherine Pacific Science, Jan 2006, Vol.60(1), pp.69-79
Caldwell, Roy L, An Observation of Inking Behavior Protecting Adult Octopus bocki from Predation by Green Turtle (Chelonia mydas) Hatchlings. Pacific Science, 2005, Vol.59(1), pp.69-72

Languages of the Solomon Islands
Unclassified languages of Oceania